Lux industries, previously known as Biswanath Hosiery Mills, is an Indian underwear company headquartered in Kolkata, West Bengal, India. Its offerings include various kinds of hosiery products for men, women and children. It is one of the oldest underwear companies in India.

History
Lux Industries was set up as the Biswanath Hosiery Mills in 1957 by the late Girdharilalji Todi. Girdharilalji's sons took over the operating responsibilities in 1964. The next 20 years saw the company growing 100 times in size through a series of marketing and manufacturing innovations. This included launching the Consumer Coupon Scheme in 1992 (Mazedar Mauka). In the same year, Lux became the first company in the industry to use celebrity brand ambassadors. In 1992, Lux launched their first television commercial with the famous yeh andar ki baat hai tagline. The following year saw the company launch their export operations and quickly established a strong presence overseas, with offices in the Middle East, Europe, and Africa. In 1994, Lux organised the first Dealer's Conference in the Indian hosiery industry and also established the industry's first International Dealers' Tour.
1995 saw the company officially changing its name to Lux industries limited. This was followed in short order by the establishment of over 500,000 retail outlets all over India, and has offices in Kolkata, Delhi, Agra, Indore, Mumbai, Ludhiana, Jaipur, and Roorkee.
Bollywood actor Sunny Deol was signed on as Lux's brand ambassador in the year 2000. He has been the face of the company ever since. In 2001, Lux went public and for the first time, ownership of the company was available outside of the Todi family. In 2003, the company launched its first IPO. The IPO was massively oversubscribed.
In 2010, Bollywood star Shah Rukh Khan was signed as a brand ambassador for Lux. Despite not directly involved in promotions of the Lux brand, Shah Rukh continues to be associated with the Lux family.

Company Analysis
According to the Individual - Audited financial statement for the Year of 2010, total net operating revenues increased with 13.96%, from INR 295.77 tens of millions to INR 337.06 tens of millions. Operating result increased from INR 10.72 tens of millions to INR 12.58 tens of millions which means 17.35% change. The results of the period increased 111.48% reaching INR 4.42 tens of millions at the end of the period against INR 2.09 tens of millions last year. Return on equity (Net income/Total equity) went from 11.01% to 19.89%, the Return On Asset (Net income / Total Asset) went from 2.79% to 4.17% and the Net Profit Margin (Net Income/Net Sales) went from 0.71% to 1.31% when compared to the same period of last year. The Debt to Equity Ratio (Total Liabilities/Equity) was 378.22% compared to 296.47% of last year. Finally, the Current Ratio (Current Assets/Current Liabilities) went from 2.48 to 3.17 when compared to the previous year.

Latest News
Capital markets regulator Sebi on Monday barred 14 entities for indulging in insider trading and ordered impounding ill-gotten gains of Rs 2.94 crore in the matter of Lux Industries Ltd.

Those banned by Sebi include Udit Todi, the son of the managing director of Lux, and is currently holding the post of executive director in the company, according to an interim order.

The surveillance alert system of Sebi had detected suspicious trading pattern in the scrip of Lux around the announcement dated May 25, 2021 regarding the audited financial results for the quarter and financial year ended March 31, 2021, wherein substantial increase in profits both on a quarter-on-quarter as well as a year-on-year basis was observed.

References

Clothing companies of India
Companies based in Kolkata
1957 establishments in West Bengal
Indian companies established in 1957
Clothing companies established in 1957
Companies listed on the Bombay Stock Exchange
Companies listed on the National Stock Exchange of India